A timeline of notable events relating to BBC Radio 4, a British national radio station which began broadcasting in September 1967.

1960s

1967
30 September – Radio 4 launches at 6:35am, replacing the BBC Home Service. The first programme to be broadcast is Farming Today.
22 December – Panel game Just a Minute is first aired with Nicholas Parsons as chairman (initially as a temporary stand-in). He would go on to present the programme until 2019.
Your Hundred Best Tunes, Choral Evensong, and Listen with Mother broadcast on Radio 4 for the first time.

1968
No events.

1969
10 July – The BBC publishes a report called "Broadcasting in the Seventies" proposing the reorganisation of programmes on the national networks and replacing regional broadcasting on BBC Radio 4 with BBC Local Radio.

1970s
1970
1 April – Choral Evensong is broadcast on Radio 4 for the final time – it transfers to BBC Radio 3 from the following week.
3 April – For the first time, both airings of Any Questions are broadcast on Radio 4. Previously, the station had only broadcast the Saturday repeat as the Friday night debut broadcast had been on BBC Radio 2.
5 April – Your Hundred Best Tunes moves from BBC Radio 4 to BBC Radio 2.
6 April 
The first editions of PM and The World Tonight are broadcast.
The first Thought for the Day is broadcast, replacing Ten to Eight.
The first edition of Start the Week is broadcast with Richard Baker as presenter.
10 April – The first broadcast of a new news and current affairs programme Analysis.
5 October – The consumer affairs programme You and Yours debuts.

1971
 4 November – Radio 4 (and Radio 2) begin broadcasting in stereo in South East England. Stereo was rolled out to the rest of the country over subsequent years.

1972
 2 April – First edition of the comedy panel game I'm Sorry I Haven't a Clue is aired.

1973
 9 April – The first edition of Kaleidoscope is broadcast.
 29 June – Programmes For Schools are broadcast on all Radio 4 frequencies for the final time. From next term they are aired only on VHF/FM.
 2 July – Woman's Hour is transferred from BBC Radio 2 to BBC Radio 4 
23 December – I'm Sorry, I'll Read That Again airs its last episode.

1974
Stop the Week is broadcast for the first time.

1975
 9 June – Proceedings in the Parliament of the United Kingdom are broadcast on radio for the first time and BBC Radio 4 broadcasts the first two hours of that day's proceedings.

1976
4 January – First broadcast of the panel game Quote... Unquote.
27 August – First broadcast of the sketch comedy show The Burkiss Way.
First broadcast of Poetry Please.

1977
30 April – The first edition of Sport on Four is broadcast.
2 May – BBC Radio 4 launches a new breakfast programme Up to the Hour. Consequently, The Today Programme is reduced from a continuous two-hour programme to two 25-minute slots.
22 August – The BBC Radio comedy The Men from the Ministry airs its final episode after fifteen years on air.
2 October – The first edition of Money Box is broadcast.

1978
3 April – Permanent radio broadcasts of proceedings in the House of Commons begin. Radio 4 marks the first day with an afternoon of live coverage. The station goes on to broadcast Prime Minister's Questions for the next year.
3 July – Changes are made to the station's weekday breakfast schedule. After just over a year on air, Up to the Hour is cancelled. Consequently, Today once again becomes a continuous two-hour programme. Also, a new weekday 6am News Briefing is introduced.  
23 November 
Radio 4's AM service moves from medium wave to 1500m (200 kHz) long wave as part of a plan to improve national AM reception, and to conform with the Geneva Frequency Plan of 1975. However long wave reception is not universal so in some parts of the UK where long wave reception is poor, filler transmitters on MW are used.
The shipping forecast transfers from BBC Radio 2 to BBC Radio 4 so that the forecast can continue to be broadcast on long wave.
The Radio 4 UK Theme is used for the first time to coincide with the network becoming a fully national service for the first time and to mark this the station is officially known as Radio 4 UK.
22 December – Industrial action at the BBC by the ABS union, which started the previous day, extends to radio when the radio unions join their television counterparts by going on strike, forcing the BBC to merge its four national radio networks into one national radio station from 4pm and called it the BBC All Network Radio Service. The strike is settled shortly before 10pm on Friday 22 December 1978, with the unions and BBC management reaching an agreement at the British government's industrial disputes arbitration service ACAS.

1979
1 April – The first edition of Feedback is broadcast.
30 September – First broadcast of The Food Programme.

1980s
1980
 Summer – Due to the continued expansion of BBC Local Radio, regional opt-out programming ends, apart from in the south west as this is now the only part of England still without any BBC local station.

1981
 No events.

1982
10 September – After 32 years on air, Listen with Mother is broadcast for the final time. It is replaced three days later by a shorter five minute lunchtime programme called Listening Corner which is transmitted on FM only whilst long wave listeners receive the lunchtime shipping forecast.
31 December – The last regional opt-out programming ends when the final edition of Morning Sou'West is broadcast ahead of the forthcoming launch of BBC Radio Devon and BBC Radio Cornwall.

1983
1 February – In Business is broadcast for the first time.

1984
5 April – Radio 4 begins what is described in Radio Times as "a new three-hour sequence – a six-month broadcast experiment in which you are invited to participate." The programme is called Rollercoaster and is presented by Richard Baker. The "Grand Finale of Radio 4's rollicking rolling experiment" takes place on 27 September  and was not repeated.
27 July – David Jacobs chairs Any Questions? for the final time.
14 September – John Timpson chairs Any Questions? for the first time.
29 September 
Radio 4 starts broadcasting 30 minutes earlier at the weekend when it launches a 20-minute Prelude, described as “a musical start to your weekend listening”. Consequently, the station is now on air every day from just before 6am until 12:30am. 
The Radio 4 UK branding is dropped and the station is now officially simply known as Radio 4.

1985
28 June – The final weeknight Study on 4 broadcast takes place.
29 June – Study on 4 is renamed Options and from this date all of BBC Radio's adult educational programming is now broadcast on weekend afternoons. The programmes continue to be broadcast only on VHF/FM. This means that Radio 4's output on weeknights between 11pm and 11:30pm – ie all of The World Tonight and The Financial World Tonight – are now also broadcast on VHF/FM.
25 July–8 August – During the 1985 school summer holidays, Radio 4 broadcasts an all-morning children's programme called Pirate Radio 4 on Thursday mornings. Three editions of the programme are aired. It is broadcast on VHF/FM only with the usual Radio 4 schedule continuing on long wave. The programme returns the following summer for three more editions.
1986
5 January – Michael Parkinson takes over as host of Desert Island Discs following the death last year of Roy Plomley.
24 December – John Timpson presents The Today programme for the final time.
28 December – Apna Hi Ghar Samajhiye (Make Yourself at Home) is broadcast for the final time. The programme, aimed at the Asian community, had been broadcast on Radio 4 and the BBC Home Service every Sunday morning since 1965.

1987
3 January – The Today programme is extended to six days a week when it launches a Saturday edition and John Humphrys joins the programme's presenting team as John Timpson's replacement.
17 July – John Timpson chairs Any Questions? for the final time.
4 September – Jonathan Dimbleby chairs Any Questions? for the first time.
27 October – BBC Radio 4 launches a new twice-weekly soap opera called Citizens.

1988
1 April – Sue Lawley replaces Michael Parkinson as host of Desert Island Discs.

1989
26 May – Radio 4 airs the 10,000th episode of The Archers.

1990s
1990
23 June – Ahead of the transfer of all of BBC radio's educational programmes to the forthcoming BBC Radio 5, the last edition of Options, the BBC's weekend afternoon strand of adult educational programmes which had been transmitted as an opt-out from the main schedule on FM, is broadcast.
29 June – Programmes For Schools are broadcast on Radio 4 for the final time.
20 August – The Moral Maze is broadcast for the first time.
24 August – Listening Corner, the weekday lunchtime programme for small children, is broadcast for the final time. 
26 August – Open University programmes are broadcast on Radio 4 FM for the final time. They will return to Radio 4 in 1994 but will be broadcast only on long wave.
27 August – The launch of Radio 5 sees the full Radio 4 schedule broadcast on FM for the first time.

1991
17 January–2 March – Radio 4 News FM, the first rolling BBC radio news service is on air during the first Gulf War. It broadcasts on the station's FM frequencies, with the regular scheduled service continuing on long wave.
25 July – The final episode of soap opera Citizens is broadcast.
13 September – The Daily Service is broadcast on FM for the final time.
16 September 
The main BBC Radio 4 service moves from long wave to FM as FM coverage has now been extended to cover almost all of the UK. Radio 4 didn't become available on FM in much of Scotland, Wales and Northern Ireland until the start of the 1990s. Opt-outs are transferred to long wave.
A new 30-minute religious slot at 10am on weekdays is launched, but is broadcast as an opt-out and therefore is only available on long wave. The first fifteen minutes is used to broadcast The Daily Service and this is followed by the launch of a 12-month series featuring readings from The Bible.
Woman’s Hour moves from early afternoons to a mid-morning slot.

1992
Late March–7 April – For the first time, Radio 4 long wave opts out of the main Radio 4 schedule to provide additional news coverage. It does so to provide live coverage of the latest developments in the general election campaign. Previously, additional news coverage had been broadcast on FM.
25 July – BBC Radio 4 stops the week for the final time, after having done so since 1974.
 15 October – The BBC announces plans to launch a continuous news service on BBC Radio 4’s long wave frequency. The date of 5th April 1994 is set as the launch date. The plan would result in Radio 4 broadcasting exclusively on FM.

1993
There is widespread opposition to the BBC's plans to launch a rolling news service on Radio 4’s long wave frequency and the proposals are dropped. A new news and sport service BBC Radio 5 Live launches the following year.
18 December – BBC 2 broadcasts the Arena special "Radio Night", an ambitious simulcast with BBC Radio 4.

1994
21 February – A new weekday afternoon magazine show starts, called Anderson Country. The programme proves divisive amongst the station’s listenership and was replaced after a year by The Afternoon Shift.
24 March – The Financial World Tonight is broadcast on Radio 4 for the final time, ahead of its move to the new news and sport station BBC Radio 5 Live.
3 April – The closure of BBC Radio 5 sees children’s programmes return to Radio 4. However, instead of daily programmes, just one weekly 30-minute programme is broadcast, aired on Sunday evenings.
8 April – Following the closure of BBC Radio 5, Test Match Special is broadcast on BBC Radio 4’s long wave frequency for the first time.
 10 April – Radio 5's closure see adult education and Open University programmes return to Radio 4. They are broadcast on long wave only as a two-hour block on Sunday evenings. Open University programmes are broadcast between February and September with language courses aired from October until January.

1995
27 September – Radio 4 begins to broadcast digitally following the commencement by the BBC of regular Digital Audio Broadcasting, initially only from the Crystal Palace transmitting station.

1996
James Boyle is appointed station controller.

1997
31 August – Regular programming on the BBC’s radio and television stations is abandoned to provide ongoing news coverage of the death of Diana, Princess of Wales. Radio 4 airs a special programme from BBC Radio News, which is also carried on BBC Radio 2, BBC Radio 3 and BBC Radio 5 Live. Radio 4 broadcasts live coverage of the funeral six days later.
 September – In the aftermath of Princess Diana's death, the PM programme drops its theme tune which had been in use since 1993. This had been the third time that the programme had used theme music and has not subsequently had a theme tune.

1998
6 April – Extensive schedule changes take place. Many long-standing programmes are axed as part of the shake-up, including Breakaway, Week Ending and Sport on Four and arts programme Kaleidoscope is replaced by a new programme Front Row with Mark Lawson as presenter. Also, the station goes on air 30 minutes earlier each day,  5:30am instead of 6am and the weekday editions of The Today programme are extended by 30 minutes to three hours.
12 April – A Sunday episode of The Archers is introduced.
19 April – A new Sunday morning current affairs programme Broadcasting House launches.

1999
April – Roger Bolton, formally of Channel 4's viewer feedback programme Right to Reply, replaces Chris Dunkley as the presenter of Feedback.  with his last episode being broadcast on BBC Radio 4 on 26 August 2022.
September – Open University broadcasts cease.

2000s
2000
March – Helen Boaden is appointed as controller.
26 December – Radio 4 clears its Boxing Day schedule in order to broadcast an eight-hour reading of Harry Potter and the Philosopher's Stone, read by Stephen Fry.

2001
Radio 4, along with other BBC Radio stations, stop broadcasting via Sky's analogue satellite service.

2002
 15 December – Radio 4 gets a digital spin-off station, BBC7. The station broadcasts content from BBC Radio’s spoken word archive, repeating programmes previously broadcast on Radio 4, as well as airing daily programmes for children.

2003
 No events.

2004
 20 February – BBC Radio 4 airs the final Letter from America. The weekly 15-minute programme ran for 2,869 shows from 24 March 1946, making it the longest-running speech radio programme in history.
 20 September – Mark Damazer replaces Helen Boaden as Controller.

2005
 No events.

2006
23 April – The Radio 4 UK Theme is used for the last time, amid controversy over its axing by Radio 4 controller Mark Damazer. The decision to axe the theme, which had been used since 1978, to make way for a 'pacy news briefing', led to widespread coverage in the media and even debate in Parliament.
24 June – The final edition of Home Truths is broadcast. 
27 August – Sue Lawley presents her final edition of BBC Radio 4's Desert Island Discs after eighteen years. Her last castaway is the actress Joan Plowright.
16 September – Saturday Live begins.

2007
 No events.

2008
4 October – BBC7 is renamed BBC Radio 7 in an effort to bring it in line with other BBC Radio brands.
 14 October – You and Yours undergoes a significant change of format, with two presenters being replaced by one. The breadth of topics covered is extended to global problems as well as those closer to home.

2009
24 May – Children's magazine show Go4It is broadcast for the final time. The reason given is that it does not attract enough young listeners and that less than 1 in 20 of the show's audience is aged between 4 and 14, with the average age of the listeners being between 52 and 55. Consequently, there are now no children's programmes on BBC analogue radio.

2010s
2010
April – The newspaper review show What the Papers Say, which was on television for 52 years, is revived on BBC Radio 4, airing for 12 episodes in the run-up to the 2010 general election. It will subsequently return on a permanent basis until March 2016.
September – Gwyneth Williams replaces Mark Damazer as station Controller.
24 December – A Christmas message by Pope Benedict XVI is broadcast by BBC Radio 4's Thought for the Day programme, the first time the Pontiff has addressed a Christmas message to one of the countries he has visited during the year.

2011
2 April – BBC7 is rebranded as BBC Radio 4 Extra.
7 November – The World at One is extended from 30 to 45 minutes.

2012
5 May – BBC Breakfast presenter Sian Williams joins Radio 4's Saturday Live magazine programme to co-host alongside Rev. Richard Coles. The programme is also extended from 60 to 90 minutes.
31 May – Radio 4 announces a five-and-a-half-hour celebration of James Joyce's Ulysses on this coming Bloomsday (16 June), claiming it as the novel's first full-length dramatisation in Britain.
5 September – It is announced that continuity announcers Charlotte Green and Harriet Cass are to take voluntary redundancy as the BBC cuts the announcing team for the station from twelve to ten. Both had been with Radio 4 since the 1970s. Charlotte leaves in January 2013, with Harriet departing two months later.

2013
16 July – Mishal Husain joins the presenting team of The Today programme.

2014
31 January – It is announced that Archers spin-off Ambridge Extra which has been on air since 2011, is to be "rested".
5 March – It is announced that Mark Lawson will step down as presenter of Radio 4's Front Row after 16 years as its host.

2015
1 January – BBC Radio 4 airs a 10-hour adaptation of Tolstoy's War and Peace written by Timberlake Wertenbaker.
28 April – Sandi Toksvig announces she is to step down as presenter of Radio 4's The News Quiz after nine years.
21 May – Figures released by RAJAR indicate that BBC Radio 4 Extra has overtaken BBC 6 Music as the most listened digital only radio station, with 2.17 million tuning in weekly to BBC Radio 4 Extra compared to 2.06 million for BBC 6 Music.
Autumn – Ahead of the departure of James Naughtie from The Today programme, Nick Robinson joins the presenting team.
8 October – Radio 4 marks National Poetry Day with a series of poems telling the story of Britain. We British: An Epic In Poetry runs throughout the day and sees Andrew Marr, Dominic West and Fiona Shaw reading works by names such as Walter Raleigh, William Shakespeare, Geoffrey Chaucer and William Wordsworth.
16 December – After 21 years, James Naughtie presents the Today programme for the final time.

2016
No events.

2017
30 January – London Evening Standard editor Sarah Sands is appointed editor of Radio 4's Today programme, replacing Jamie Angus. She becomes the second woman to take the role after Jenny Abramsky was appointed to the position in 1986.
29 March – BBC Radio 4 broadcasts the magazine programme Midweek, presented by Libby Purves, for the last time after 30 years.
10 April – Controller Gwyneth Williams announces that the arts programme Saturday Review will be axed in the Autumn as part of cost-cutting measures, instead, Front Row will get a Saturday highlights edition.
27 July – The BBC reverses its decision to axe Saturday Review.
27 December – Prince Harry guest edits the Today programme, on which is included guest interviews with former US President Barack Obama and Prince Charles.

2018
April – Martha Kearney and Sarah Montague swap roles with Sarah leaving the Today programme after 17 years and Martha leaving The World at One after 11 years.
8 August – Eddie Mair presents PM for the final time. He had presented the programme for the past 20 years.

2019
28 June – Jonathan Dimbleby steps down as chair of Any Questions?, having presented the programme for nearly 32 years.
5 July – Kirsty Young announces she is stepping down as presenter of Radio 4's Desert Island Discs. Lauren Laverne is announced as cover presenter for the foreseeable future.
August – Mohit Bakaya replaces Gwyneth Williams as station controller.
19 September – John Humphrys presents his final edition of Radio 4's Today programme after 32 years on the programme.
18 October – BBC political correspondent Chris Mason takes over as presenter of Any Questions?.

2020s
2020
30 January – Sarah Sands announces she is standing down as editor of BBC Radio 4's The Today Programme after three years in the post.
30 April – The British Library is to archive hundreds of essays submitted to BBC Radio 4's PM programme by listeners detailing their coronavirus experiences. The Covid Chronicles, launched in March, has seen listeners submit their accounts of their lives during the lockdown restrictions, some of which have been broadcast.
1 June – An episode of Radio 4's The Infinite Monkey Cage becomes the first BBC programme to be recorded with a live audience at home.
1 October – Dame Jenni Murray presents her final edition of Woman's Hour.
31 December – Jane Garvey presents her final edition of Woman's Hour.

2021
4 January – Emma Barnett takes over as presenter of Woman's Hour, presenting the programme on Monday to Thursday.
15 January 
Anita Rani joins BBC Radio 4's Woman's Hour to present the programme's Friday and Saturday editions.
BBC Radio 4 confirms Elizabeth Day and Johny Pitts as new presenters of the Open Book programme, with Day making her debut on 17 January and Pitts making his debut on 31 January. They replace Mariella Frostrup who had presented the programme since 2003.
9–11 April – Following the death of Prince Philip, Duke of Edinburgh, BBC Radio 4 abandons half its regular Friday, Saturday, and Sunday weekend programming in favour of simulcasting the BBC Radio News special programme and from 4pm the station broadcasts a revised schedule for the rest of the day and over the weekend.
17 May – BBC Radio 4's Woman's Hour is extended from 45 minutes to a full hour.
6 September – Sue Perkins takes over as the permanent host of Just a Minute.

2022
26 May – BBC Director-General Tim Davie announces plans for an annual £500m of savings that will see the closure of BBC Radio 5 Live's medium wave service, BBC Radio 4's long wave service and BBC Radio 4 Extra. There are also changes to local radio, with plans for shared content and the cancellation of some programmes that are not drawing a large enough audience.
 8–19 September – Following the death of Queen Elizabeth II, BBC Radio 4 abandons some of its regular scheduled programming in favour of simulcasting a BBC Radio News special programme on the day of her death. The station broadcasts a revised schedule from 9 to 11 September and on 19 September the day of the funeral.
 14 October – Andrea Catherwood succeeds Roger Bolton as presenter of Radio 4's Feedback.

References

BBC Radio 4
Radio 4